Murderer is a 10" EP by Duluth, Minnesota slowcore group Low, released in 2003. Limited to 2000 copies worldwide. 1000 numbered copies on black vinyl in the US, 500 copies on translucent red colored vinyl (numbered) in Europe, and the final 500 copies on clear vinyl, to be sold in a boxed set once the series of Vinyl Films 10" releases is completed.  In addition to the 2000 declared copies, there exists "promotional" copies that were pressed on dark red/black swirl. The art for this record is by Duluth, Minnesota photographer Jason Huntzinger.

Track A1 differs from the version that appears on the full-length release, Drums and Guns.

Track A2 differs from the version that appears on the full-length release, The Great Destroyer.

In December 2003, American webzine Somewhere Cold voted Murderer Vinyl of the Year on their 2003 Somewhere Cold Awards Hall of Fame list.

Track listing
 A1. "Murderer"  – 3:05
 A2. "Silver Rider" – 5:26 (vinyl version)
 B. "From Your Place On Sunset" – 8:16

References

2003 EPs
Low (band) EPs